Robert Brunham was a member of Parliament for Bishop's Lynn (now King's Lynn), Norfolk, England, in 1402 and 1417.

See also
Margery Kempe
John Brunham

References 

English MPs 1402
English MPs 1417
King's Lynn
Year of birth missing
Year of death missing